Pauline Croft is an English historian, professor, and writer. She is a reader in history at the Royal Holloway, University of London. She has published on the 16th and 17th centuries (part of early modern Britain) in British history.

Major works
 King James, by Pauline Croft (2003). Published by Palgrave Macmillan. 
James I was the first Stuart king of England. Croft's book is currently considered the best overview of his reign.

References

English historians